Will Hunter (born March 24, 1979 in Chester, Pennsylvania) is an American former professional football player who was a safety for the Minnesota Vikings of the National Football League (NFL).

High School Years
Hunter attended Chester High School in Chester, Pennsylvania.
While attending Chester High, Hunter was a Super Prep and Tom Lemming All-Regional selection, he was a third-team All-State, All-Del val and All-Area selection, he was also selected for the "Big 33" Pennsylvania vs. Ohio All-Star Game. He played in the Hero Bowl, which is the Delaware County All-Star game. In his senior year, with six interceptions, 20 pass break-ups, 25 unassisted tackles, 45 assisted tackles, 32 receptions for 628 yards, and six touchdowns.

College Years 
Switching around between the Safety and Cornerback positions, Hunter was a four-year letter-winner for Syracuse University.  He was team Captain of the Orangemen his senior year. He was named to the fall Director's Honor Roll 2000-2001, he received the Coach Mac Award (awarded for Intensity, Focus, Effort, and Positive Attitude on the gridiron), and was selected to the "Grid Iron Classic" all-star game. In his college career, he recorded 156 total tackles, 3 interceptions (1 returned for touchdown), 10 sacks, 21 pass deflections, 5 forced fumbles, and 6 fumble recoveries. He ran a 4.57s 40-yard dash, 37.5 vertical jump, he weighed 195, benched 395, and squatted 465.

Professional Years 
Hunter played briefly with the New York Jets, Tampa Bay Buccaneers, and New York Giants before ending up with the Minnesota Vikings.

Coaching career 
He worked as defensive coordinator for Onondaga Central High School.
He was then Assistant Head Coach Cortland Bulldogs, Semi-Professional Organization.
He was also Defensive Backs Coach Cortland State Red Dragons, NCAA Division III, New Jersey Athletic Conference (NJAC).

References

External links
 http://camphunter.org
Vikings' Alumni page

1979 births
American football defensive tackles
Chester High School alumni
Cologne Centurions (NFL Europe) players
Living people
Minnesota Vikings players
Players of American football from Pennsylvania
Sportspeople from Chester, Pennsylvania
Syracuse University alumni